Shivajirao Shankarao Deshmukh (30 July 1931 – 28 June 1977) was a Member of Parliament from Parbhani in Maharashtra, India. He served during the 3rd, 4th and 5th Lok Sabha and was elected as an Indian National Congress candidate.

He served as an elected Secretary of Congress Parliamentary Committee for two terms, 1968–69 and 1969–70 and was Member of Executive Committee, Congress Parliamentary Committee, 1967—70 and also Founder President of Marathwada Sahakari Sakhar karkhana at
Dongarkada village in Kalamnuri taluka Dist. Hingoli. He was married to Shrimati Shalini, he has son Shri Sambhajirao Shivajirao Deshmukh and two daughters Sushma and Sujata. He has studied law in Hyderabad.

References 

People from Akola district
Living people
1931 births
People from Parbhani district
People from Hingoli
India MPs 1962–1967
India MPs 1967–1970
India MPs 1971–1977
Lok Sabha members from Maharashtra
People from Marathwada
Marathi politicians